FFA may refer to:

Aviation and military
 First Flight Airport, near Kitty Hawk, North Carolina, United States
 Free-fire area in U.S. military parlance
 Flug- und Fahrzeugwerke Altenrhein, a Swiss aircraft and railway vehicle manufacturer
 Feldflieger Abteilung, of the German army's air service in World War I

Business and commerce
 Ferrara Fire Apparatus, a builder of fire trucks and other emergency vehicles
 Forward freight agreement
 Field force automation
 Furniture, fixtures and equipment (accounting), sometimes "furniture, fixtures and accessories" (FF&A)

Entertainment
 Final Fantasy Adventure, Game Boy game that is actually part of the Mana series
 Final Fantasy Anthology, a computer role-playing game compilation
 Far from Alaska, a Brazilian stoner rock group
 Food for Animals, an American hip-hop group

Finance
 FFA Private Bank 
 Fellow of the Faculty of Actuaries
 Financial Fraud Action UK
 Forward-forward agreement
 Free File Alliance in the United States
 Full fiscal autonomy for Scotland
 Fellow member of the Institute of Financial Accountants

Sport
 Fédération française d'athlétisme, the governing body for the sport of athletics in France
 FFA Centre of Excellence, a defunct Australian football club
 Florida Football Alliance, an amateur American football league
 Football Federation Australia
 Football Federation of Armenia
 First free ascent, in climbing and mountaineering
 First female free ascent, in climbing and mountaineering (this term is also initialised as an FFFA)

Science and computing
 Fast folding algorithm
 Finite field arithmetic
 Fixed-Field alternating gradient Accelerator
 Flash flood watch, issued by the United States National Weather Service
 Ford–Fulkerson algorithm
 Free fatty acid
 Fusiform face area
 Fundus fluorescein angiography; see fluorescein angiography

Other uses
 Federal Firearms Act
 Ffairfach railway station, in Wales
 Free for All (disambiguation)
 National FFA Organization, America's largest youth led organization.  Previously, it was Future Farmers of America. The name was changed to be more inclusive of all members.
 Pacific Islands Forum Fisheries Agency
 Fatima Family Apostolate, a U.S.-based Roman Catholic organization